This is a list of Middlesex University people, including notable alumni and staff associated with the university.

Alumni

Artists and sculptors

 Neville Brody, English graphic designer, typographer and art director
 Chinwe Chukwuogo-Roy, Nigerian-born British visual artist
 Gillian Condy, South African botanical artist
 Allen Jones, sculptor
 Sir Anish Kapoor, sculptor
 Keith Khan, British artist, co-founder of Motiroti
 Langlands and Bell, artists
 Conrad Leach, artist and custom motorcycle designer
 John Lundberg, artist and filmmaker
 Stephen D. Nash, English wildlife artist
 Michael Petry, American multi-media artist; co-director of the Museum of Installation in London
 Jane Ray, British illustrator of children's books
 Deganit Stern Schocken, Israeli jewelry artist
 Lola Young, British artist, teacher and Crossbench peer
 David Wightman, English painter

Fashion and film industry

 Freema Agyeman, actress (Martha Jones in Doctor Who)
 Charlotte Bellamy, British actress
 BodyMap, designers Mike Holah and Stevie Stewart
 Adam Brown, English actor, comedian, and pantomime
Danyul Brown, celebrity stylist
 Mike Figgis, film director, writer and composer
 Ashley Isham, fashion designer
 Malcolm Kohll, South African script writer and producer
 Matthew Marsden, actor
 Oliver Mason, actor
 Petra Massey, British actress
 Helen Mirren, actress, star of Calendar Girls and The Queen
 Peter Polycarpou, actor
 Venkat Prabhu, Indian film director
 Kevin Sacre, actor; plays Jake Dean in Hollyoaks
 Dan Skinner, British actor and comedy writer
 Rob Spendlove, British actor
 Arulnithi Tamilarasu, Indian actor
 Dickon Tolson, British actor 
 Arabella Weir, British comedian, actress and writer

Sports

 Joe Beevers, professional poker player
 Montell Douglas, sprinter
 Joe Joyce, professional boxer
 Simeon Williamson, sprinter
 Zooey Perry, handball player

Literature, journalism and mass media

 Monica Ali, writer, author of Brick Lane
 Ben Barkow, writer
 Nicholas Blincoe, novelist and screenwriter
 Henry Bond, writer and photographer
 Martin Booth, novelist
 Neil Daniels, freelance British writer
 John Diamond, British broadcaster and journalist
 Richard Dinnick, screenwriter and author
 Ruth England, British television presenter and actress
 James Heartfield, writer
 David Hepworth, journalist, broadcaster and magazine publisher
 James Herbert, novelist
 Laura Hird, novelist
 Stephen Jordan, writer and director
 Louise Lear, BBC weather presenter
 Suzanne Moore, British journalist
 Dermot O'Leary, TV presenter
 Tony Richards, dark fantasy or horror author
Peace Hyde, West African correspondent for Forbes Africa

Music, radio and entertainment

 Adam Ant (real name: Stuart Goddard), musician
 Kuljit Bhamra, composer, record producer, musician
 Bibio (real name: Stephen Wilkinson), British music producer
 Alan Carr, comedian
 Paul Carr, guitarist, former member of the James Taylor Quartet
 Jon "JS" Clayden and Mark Clayden, musicians (Pitchshifter)
 Ray Davies, CBE, musician (The Kinks)
 Marina Diamandis, singer-songwriter
 Jo Enright, comedian
 Adam Ficek, drummer for Babyshambles
 Bryn Fowler, bassist in The Holloways
 Roger Glover, musician (Deep Purple)
 Alison Goldfrapp, musician (Goldfrapp)
 Neil Grainger, actor and comedian
 Jake Hook, songwriter, music producer and singer
 Milton Jones, comedian
 Russell Kane, writer and comedian
 Kevin Kerrigan, music producer, composer
 Led Bib, jazz band
 Iain Lee, radio presenter
 Naser Mestarihi, hard rock musician
 Deborah Mollison, British composer, songwriter
 Ruth Ojadi, singer
 Vic Reeves, comedian
 Dave Sturt, British bass player and producer
 Johnny Vegas, comedian
 Joanne Yeoh, Malaysian violinist

Politics and public service

 Kwame Addo-Kufuor, Ghanaian politician and physician
 Ahmed Shakeel Shabbir Ahmed, Kenyan politician
 Gladys Asmah, Minister for Fisheries, Ghana
 Gareth Bennett, UKIP Member of the National Assembly for Wales
 Christine Butler, MP (Labour)
 Mike Gapes, MP (Labour)
 Mohamed Al-Amin Mohamed Al-Hadi, Somalian politician
 Abdi Yusuf Hassan, Somali politician and diplomat
 Nick Harvey, MP, Liberal Democrats
 Kim Howells, MP (Labour)
 Ray Lewis, Guyana-born youth worker, former Deputy Mayor of London
 Michael Lyons, former Labour Party councillor and the Chairman of the BBC Trust
 Clifford Sibusiso Mamba, Swazi diplomat; former Olympic athlete
 Tom Nairn, theorist on nationalism, political activist
 Steve Sinnott, general secretary, National Union of Teachers
  Tan Tee Beng, Malaysian politician
 Özlem Türköne, Turkish columnist and politician

Other

 Ralph Alabi, Nigerian engineer, industrialist
 Yannis Behrakis, Greek photojournalist
 Timothy Campbell, winner of The Apprentice
 Lady Sarah Chatto, daughter of Princess Margaret
 Slash Coleman, American storyteller, producer, and writer
 William Gibson, British historian, academic, and professor
 Mavin Khoo, Malaysian dancer
 Nick Leeson, former rogue derivatives trader
 Bello Bala Shagari, Nigerian activist
 Mazhar Majeed, sporting agent
 Suzannah Olivier, nutritionist
 John Rowan, counsellor, psychotherapist, clinical supervisor 
 Sue Sanders, British LGBT rights activist
 Stephen Sizer, Anglican priest
 Dave Snowden, Welsh lecturer, consultant, researcher 
 Victoria Stillwell, TV presenter; dog trainer
 Blay Whitby, philosopher and technology ethicist
 Myo Myint Kyaw, technopreneur

Academics

Faculty of Arts and Creative Industries 
 David Rain (Creative Writing)
 Chris Batchelor (jazz)
 Sonia Boyce (Fine Art) 
 Richard Billingham (Photography)
 James Martin Charlton (Creative Writing)
 Katy Deepwell (Art theory and criticism)
 Peter Fribbins (Music)
 Nikki Iles (jazz)
 Keith Piper (Fine Art)
 Eva Vermandel (Photography)
 Sarah Wardle (Creative Writing)

Faculty of Professional and Social Sciences 
 David Conway, Professor Emeritus of Philosophy
 Stephan Dahl (marketing)
 Ed Gallagher (environmental studies)
 John Grahl (European integration)
 Ivor Grattan-Guinness, Professor Emeritus of the History of Mathematics and Logic
 Bernard Ingham (marketing)
 John Lea (Criminology – left realism; law and order)
 Irena Papadopoulos (Transcultural nursing research)
 John Redwood (management)
 Ivan Roitt (Director, Centre for Investigative & Diagnostic Oncology)
 Vincenzo Ruggiero (Sociology  – organised and corporate crime)
 Doirean Wilson (Equality Diversity & Inclusion and Cross Cultural Studies)
 Lola Young, Professor Emeritus of cultural studies

Faculty of Science and Technology 
 Roman Belavkin (computing science)
 Meir Manny Lehman (computing science)
 David Turner (computing science)

References

External links
 Alumni Association and the Development Office of Middlesex University

Middlesex University
Middlesex University